Jared Donaldson (born October 9, 1996) is a former American professional tennis player from Glocester, Rhode Island.  
Donaldson was the only American to qualify for the inaugural Next Generation ATP Finals at the end of 2017 as the fifth seed. He has won a Challenger title in singles as well as doubles, with both of them having come at the Royal Lahaina Challenger in 2015.

Junior career

Donaldson trained on the red clay in Buenos Aires for two years instead of following the conventional route of joining a tennis academy or USTA Player Development. His time there dramatically improved his consistency, movement and mental game. Having never claimed any prestigious junior crowns (Orange Bowl, Junior Grand Slams, Les Petits), Donaldson reached the final of the 2013 USTA Boys 18s National Championship at the age of 16, where he lost to Collin Altamirano in straight sets. Donaldson also attended the Gordon School and played middle school tennis there.

Professional career

Early years

At the 2013 US Open, Donaldson reached the final round of qualifying, beating two players in the Top 250.

He continued to play extensively in the Turkey and US Futures circuit until breaking through with three consecutive Futures titles in June 2014. Donaldson then qualified for his first ATP event in Washington, D.C. at the Citi Open. He made an official statement about turning pro instead of playing collegiate tennis on August 22, 2014, just short of his 18th birthday.

He received main draw wildcards into the singles and doubles tournaments at the 2014 US Open. Although he lost to Gaël Monfils in straight sets, he received high praise from many of the tennis elite.

In January 2015, he won his first Challenger title at the 2015 Royal Lahaina Challenger in Maui, allowing him to move into the top 200 of the ATP rankings. He also won the doubles title in Maui with partner Stefan Kozlov. The following month, he won his first ATP level match at the 2015 Memphis Open, this time defeating Kozlov.

2016: Top 100 
Donaldson made it through qualifying at the US Open. He then recorded the biggest win of his career, knocking off 12th-seeded David Goffin in the first round. He then beat Viktor Troicki before losing to Ivo Karlović in the third round, which was enough to push him into the top 100 of the ATP rankings for the first time.

2017: First Masters 1000 quarterfinal, ATP Tour-level consistency, Top 50 debut
With a higher ranking and consistent success, Donaldson was able to play primarily in ATP Tour level events throughout the year. He solidified his position in the Top 100 by reaching the fourth round of the Miami Open as a qualifier, rising from No. 95 to No. 73 in the ATP rankings. After a relatively quiet clay court season, Donaldson continued his climb in the rankings by making it to the third round at Wimbledon. Later in the summer, he scored two of the biggest wins of his career over No. 18 Lucas Pouille and No. 14 Roberto Bautista Agut in the first round at the 2017 Canada Open and 2017 Cincinnati Masters respectively, where in the latter he reached the quarterfinals at a Masters level event for the first time. These two successful runs helped to catapult Donaldson to a then career high ATP ranking of No. 50 in the world on 23 October 2017.

2018: First ATP semifinal
Donaldson's first big result of the year came at the Mexican Open, an ATP 500 event. He made it through to his first ATP semifinal to reach a new career high ranking of No. 48.

2019: Comeback & Career suspension 
Donaldson came back at the 2019 Delray Beach Open but was forced later in the year to suspend his professional career after continuing struggles with Patellar tendinitis.

2021: Retirement

Playing style
Unlike many of his other top American contemporaries (such as John Isner and Jack Sock, among others) whose success relies on big serves and forehands, Donaldson's strength is in his return game. In the 2017 season, Donaldson was the 6th-highest ranked American (51st overall). He rated behind all five above him in serving, but was the best returner out of the group at 32nd on the tour, according to Infosys Nia Data.

Challenger and Futures finals

Singles: 7 (4–3)

Doubles: 2 (1–1)

Performance timelines

Singles

Record against other players

Record against top 10 players
Donaldson's match record against those who have been ranked in the top 10, with those who have been No. 1 in boldface

  Nicolás Almagro 1–0
  Marcos Baghdatis 1–0
  Fabio Fognini 1–0
  Taylor Fritz 1–0
  David Goffin 1–0
  Gilles Simon 1–0
  Janko Tipsarević 1–0
  Lucas Pouille 1–1
  Diego Schwartzman 1–1
  Roberto Bautista Agut 1–2
  Stefanos Tsitsipas 1–2
  Tomáš Berdych 0–1
  Pablo Carreño Busta 0–1
  Grigor Dimitrov 0–1
  Karen Khachanov 0–1
  Gaël Monfils 0–1
  Kei Nishikori 0–1
  Milos Raonic 0–1
  Kevin Anderson 0–2
  John Isner 0–2
  Daniil Medvedev 0–2
  Rafael Nadal 0–2
  Denis Shapovalov 0–2
  Jack Sock 0–2
  Dominic Thiem 0–2
  Stan Wawrinka 0–2

<small>''*.

References

External links
 
 

American male tennis players
1996 births
Living people
Sportspeople from Providence, Rhode Island
Tennis people from Rhode Island